Luvo Manyonga (born 8 January 1991) is a South African track and field athlete who specialises in the long jump. He won the 2017 World Championship in London and the 2018 Commonwealth Games title in the Gold Coast, Australia. He was the Olympic silver medallist in 2016 in Rio de Janeiro.

Manyonga was world junior champion in 2010, and the African Games champion in 2011. He competed at the 2011 World Championships in Athletics, placing fifth. He was the runner-up at the 2016 African Championships in Athletics.

In 2021, he was given a four-year ban following failure to provide anti-doping officials with sufficient information to complete drug testing. The ban will last until December 2024.

Career

Early life and career
Manyonga was born 8 January 1991 and raised in Mbekweni township in Paarl, a city in the far south-west of South Africa. His father, John, a fork-lift truck driver, was largely absent, leaving Manyonga to be raised by his mother, Joyce, a domestic cleaner. Given his surroundings, Manyonga had a poverty-stricken and dysfunctional upbringing, though his mother maintained the family home for him and his older brother and sister. He took part in local track and field competitions and his talent for long jump was soon identified. A local coach, Mario Smith, was surprised by the young man's ability and immediately set about supporting Manyonga towards a professional career.

Manyonga had his first international success at the 2009 African Junior Athletics Championships. Travelling to Mauritius, he jumped  for the bronze medal.

A breakthrough came the year after when he jumped  to win at the Weltklasse in Biberach in Germany. This jump was in the top ten all-time by an under-20 athlete at that point. He delivered on that performance with a gold medal at the 2010 World Junior Championships in Athletics, becoming only the second African to win a horizontal jumps medal at the competition (after fellow South African Godfrey Khotso Mokoena. Seeing his progress, he set himself targets to qualify for the 2010 Commonwealth Games and the 2012 London Olympics.

Africa Games champion
He arrived on the senior international scene in the 2011 season. He qualified to represent South Africa at the 2011 World Championships in Athletics – one of two South Africans competing, alongside Godfrey Khotso Mokoena. He jumped  to make the final while reigning world silver medallist Mokoena failed to progress.

Two weeks later he appeared at the All-Africa Games and defeated former champions Ignisious Gaisah and Ndiss Kaba Badji to take the gold medal. He was runner-up at the DecaNation in his last top level performance of the year.

Tik use and doping suspension
Manyonga opened his 2012 season with a jump of eight metres on the national Yellow Pages Series. However, the winnings of 80,000 Rand that he had received from his performances the previous year disrupted his life. Family and friends came to rely on him financially and he quickly fell into debt. Coach Mario Smith began to support Manyonga's family at his own expense so the jumper could focus on training. Around this time, Manyonga had become a regular user of tik – the local variant of crystal methamphetamine commonly used in his township. He first tried the recreational drug in 2011 and had used it when outside of competition (when it would not constitute a doping offence), but he gave a positive doping test in-competition at a national series meet on 20 March. He waived his right to have a "B" sample testing and admitted taking the drug for non-performance-enhancing reasons, resulting in his suspension from competition. He admitted he had developed an addiction in the preceding months and was admitted for drug rehabilitation.

His coach Mario Smith was his advocate at the tribunal for the doping offence. Smith argued for a reduced period of sanction, entered as mitigating factors Manyonga's poor family situation, use of the drug for non-enhancing reasons, and lack of education on doping matters. The prosecutor argued for a full two-year ban, based on Manyonga's admittance of taking the drug and his strict liability in that regard, though they also noted that the athlete had suffered a failure of support from the South African Sports Confederation and Olympic Committee, Athletics South Africa and Stellenbosch Athletics Club, despite being one of the country's best Olympic athletes.

Manyonga began working with John McGrath, an Irishman and strength training coach, in 2014. Planning a return to action, Smith sent paperwork to the national athletics body for entry to the 2014 Commonwealth Games. This was not processed correctly and ultimately Manyonga did not compete. Smith died that year during a car accident while on his way to visit his athlete in Mbekweni. Manyonga's life spiralled and he missed his coach's memorial, having come across some friends taking tik en route. Following this, the National Olympic Committee president Gideon Sam visited the athlete's family home. Shocked by his situation, Sam arranged for the Committee to pay for training and accommodation at University of Pretoria's High Performance Centre. Manyonga reacted positively, saying "I decided I can't take it anymore in Cape Town because that is where I hook myself up with the devil." He began training again full-time in mid-2015.

Return to track
Having missed four outdoor seasons since 2012, Manyonga returned to professional track competition in 2016. He faltered at the South African Athletics Championships, mistiming his jumps and ending in 13th place. He was back over eight metres on his IAAF Diamond League debut at the Golden Gala, then claimed his first senior medal in almost five years at the 2016 African Championships in Athletics in Durban through a wind-assisted . This made it a South African 1–2 as Manyonga was runner-up to Rushwahl Samaai.

He entered the 2016 Rio Olympics ranked in the world's top ten jumpers.  In the Olympics, he was in the top four throughout the competition, leaping into the lead with his fifth round 8.37 m.  He was surpassed by Jeff Henderson's final jump of 8.38 m to take the Olympic silver medal.

Manyonga won the gold at the 2017 World Championships in London, jumping 8.48 metres.

Manyonga continued a great run of form by winning the gold medal at the 2018 Commonwealth Games, jumping a games record of 8.41 metres in the final.

Personal bests
Long jump –  (2017)
Triple jump –  (2010)

International competitions

See also
List of doping cases in athletics

References

External links
 
 All-Athletics profile
 
 

1991 births
Living people
Sportspeople from Paarl
South African male long jumpers
World Athletics Championships athletes for South Africa
Doping cases in athletics
South African sportspeople in doping cases
Athletes (track and field) at the 2016 Summer Olympics
Athletes (track and field) at the 2018 Commonwealth Games
Olympic athletes of South Africa
Olympic silver medalists for South Africa
Medalists at the 2016 Summer Olympics
Olympic silver medalists in athletics (track and field)
Commonwealth Games medallists in athletics
Commonwealth Games gold medallists for South Africa
African Games gold medalists for South Africa
African Games medalists in athletics (track and field)
World Athletics Championships medalists
Olympic male long jumpers
Athletes (track and field) at the 2011 All-Africa Games
World Athletics Championships winners
Diamond League winners
Commonwealth Games gold medallists in athletics
Medallists at the 2018 Commonwealth Games